A buttress dam or hollow dam is a dam with a solid, water-tight upstream side that is supported at intervals on the downstream side by a series of buttresses or supports. The dam wall may be straight or curved. Most buttress dams are made of reinforced concrete and are heavy, pushing the dam into the ground. Water pushes against the dam, but the buttresses are inflexible and prevent the dam from falling over.

Buttress or hollow gravity dams were originally built to retain water for irrigation or mining in areas of scarce or expensive resources but cheap labour. A buttress dam is a good choice in wide valleys where solid rock is rare.

As designs have become more sophisticated, the virtues and weaknesses of buttress dams have become apparent. The Romans were the first to use buttresses to increase the stability of a dam wall. 

Buttress dams of slab concrete construction became popular in the United States in the early 20th Century with the patented process of Norwegian-American civil engineer Nils F. Ambursen.

Construction
Buttressed dams are so-called 'permitted dams'. They consist of piers of triangular cross-section with a free space between the piers and a sloping wall on the water side. The loads from the horizontal water head are transmitted underground through the wall and the columns. The load on the ground is relatively high due to the small footprint, which is why column foundations require a sufficiently load-bearing foundation.

Depending on the shape of the pillars and the slab or vault water wall, a distinction is made between:
 Pier dam
 Holpfeilerstauer
 Pillar slab dam
 Pillar vaulted dam

Notes

External links
Buttress dams Table of contents
An introduction to buttress dams

 
Dams by type
.
Concrete buildings and structures
Masonry dams